Yazoo Records is an American record label founded in the mid-1960s by Nick Perls. It specializes in early American blues, country, jazz, and other rural American genres collectively known as roots music.

History

The first five releases (L 1001 to L 1005) were issued under the label name of Belzona Records. The label was then renamed Yazoo Records, and the first five releases were reissued under the new name.

The Belzona and Yazoo labels featured an Art Deco drawing of a peacock, adapted from the 1927 label of Black Patti Records.

For Yazoo Records Perls compiled rare 78-rpm recordings made in the 1920s by musicians such as Charley Patton, Blind Willie McTell, the Memphis Jug Band, Blind Blake, and Blind Lemon Jefferson. Perls founded a second label, Blue Goose Records, in 1970, for which he recorded "rediscovered" black blues artists and younger blues and jazz performers.

In 1989 Yazoo was acquired by Shanachie Records. In 2014, Yazoo signed its first current artists, The Reverend Peyton's Big Damn Band and released their album So Delicious on February 17, 2015.

Artists

 Barbecue Bob
 Scrapper Blackwell
 Blind Blake
 Big Bill Broonzy
 Gus Cannon
 Bo Carter
 Reverend Gary Davis
 Sleepy John Estes
 Blind Boy Fuller
 Blind Uncle Gaspard
 Mississippi John Hurt
 Skip James
 Blind Lemon Jefferson
 Tommy Johnson
 Blind Willie Johnson
 Eddie Lang
 Furry Lewis
 Charley Lincoln
 Dennis McGee
 Blind Willie McTell
 Memphis Jug Band
 Mississippi Sheiks
 Charley Patton
 The Reverend Peyton's Big Damn Band
 Washington Phillips
 Ma Rainey
 Leo Soileau
 Charlie Spand
 Frank Stokes
 Roosevelt Sykes
 Tampa Red
 Henry Thomas
 Benny Thomasson
 Joe Venuti
 Peetie Wheatstraw
 Casey Bill Weldon
 Robert Wilkins

See also
 List of record labels

References

External links
 Official site - broken link as of 9-21-21
 Shanachie Entertainment
 Illustrated Yazoo Records discography

American record labels
Blues record labels
Jazz record labels
Folk record labels
Reissue record labels